The Elder Miss Blossom (also released under the titles Wanted a Wife and Choosing a Wife) is a 1918 British silent drama film directed by Percy Nash and starring Isobel Elsom, Minna Grey and Owen Nares. It was shot at Isleworth Studios.

Cast
 Isobel Elsom as Sophie Blossom  
 Minna Grey as The elder Miss Blossom  
 Owen Nares as Curate  
 C. M. Hallard as Andrew Quick  
 Tom Reynolds

References

Bibliography
 Harris, Ed. Britain's Forgotten Film Factory: The Story of Isleworth Studios. Amberley Publishing, 2012.

External links

1918 films
1918 drama films
British drama films
British silent feature films
Films directed by Percy Nash
Films set in England
Films shot at Isleworth Studios
Films based on British novels
British black-and-white films
1910s English-language films
1910s British films
Silent drama films